London Fields is an area of Hackney, East London, United Kingdom. It may also refer to:

London Fields Brewery, brewery in the London Fields area
London Fields railway station, railway station in London Fields
London Fields, Dudley, an area of Dudley, West Midlands
London Fields (novel), 1989 novel by Martin Amis
London Fields (film), 2018 film based on the novel
On London Fields, opera in two acts by Matthew King with a libretto by Alasdair Middleton, notable for its use of multiple ensembles and choruses

See also
London moment or London field, quantum-mechanical phenomenon whereby a spinning superconductor generates a magnetic field whose axis lines up exactly with the spin axis